Thindal is a neighborhood of Erode city in Tamil Nadu. It is located 8 km from Erode Junction and 7 km from Central Bus Terminus, Erode. It is now officially a part of Erode Municipal Corporation. The locality is well known for the Thindal Murugan Temple (Velayudaswami temple).

The neighborhood is located along the arterial Perundurai Road which connects the city with western districts like Tiruppur, Coimbatore and Kerala. Outer Ring Road connecting all the arterial roads of the city intersects Perundurai road in Thindal. It is a developing area due to the initiation of various educational institutions.

Educational Institutions 

Vellalar College for Women (government aided-autonomous) since 1970
 Velalar College of Engineering and Technology
Vellalar College of Education for Women
 VET Institute of Arts and Science
 Vellalar Matriculation Higher Secondary School for Girls Since 1980
 Vellalar High School for Girls
 Vellalar Vidyalaya Senior Secondary School
 Vellalar College of Nursing 
 Vellalar Teacher' Training Institute
 Govt. High School, Thindal
 BVB Matric Higher Secondary School, Thindal.
 The BVB, Therkku pallam, Thindal.
 URC Matriculation School 
 AET Matriculation School
 The Indian Public School
 Geethanjanli All India Senior Secondary school - CBSE
 CS Academy

Nearby places

Nearby places include Texvalley, Gangapuram (6 km). Vellode Bird Sanctuary (11.5 km), Bhavani Sangameswarar Temple (12.9 km), Villarasampatti (2.8 km), Koorapalayam (5.1 km), Ellapalayam (5.1 km), Kavundachipalayam (5.9 km)

References 

Neighbourhoods in Erode